Baltis Vallis  is a sinuous channel on Venus ranging from  wide and ~ long, slightly longer than the Nile and the longest known channel of any kind in the Solar System. It is thought the channel once held a river of lava. There appear to be other, smaller channels in the same area, down to the limit of resolution, some of which seem to be tributaries of Baltis Vallis.

The lava must have had a very low viscosity, possibly due to a carbonatite composition. The average depths and widths of the channel are 46 ± 16 m and 2.2 ± 0.4 km, respectively. 

The channel is located in an area consisting entirely of plains and wrinkle ridges. The formation of the channel may be associated with a single event that emplaced a large unit that type of volcanic terrain. At present, the terminus is slightly higher in elevation than the source.

Both ends of the channel are obscured, so its original length is unknown. Similar channel-like features are common on the plains of Venus. In some places they appear to have been formed by lava which may have melted or thermally eroded a path over the plains' surface. They resemble terrestrial meandering rivers in some aspects, with meanders, cutoff bows and abandoned channel segments. However, Venusian channels are not as tightly sinuous as terrestrial rivers. Most are partly buried by younger lava plains, making their sources difficult to identify. A few have vast radar-dark plains units associated with them, suggesting large flow volumes. These channels with large deposits appear to be older than other channel types, as they are crossed by fractures and wrinkle ridges, and are often buried by other volcanic materials. In addition, they appear to run both upslope and downslope, suggesting that the plains were warped by regional tectonism after channel formation.

References

 

Volcanism on Venus
Volcanic landforms
Lava channels